Engelbert II may refer to:

 Engelbert II of Istria (died 1141)
 Engelbert II, Count of Gorizia (died 1191)
 Engelbert II of Berg (1185 or 1186 – 1225)
 Engelbert II of Falkenburg (1220–1274), Archbishop of Cologne
 Engelbert II of the Mark (died 1328)
 Engelbert II of Nassau (1451–1504)